Covina is a city in the San Gabriel Valley region of Los Angeles County, California, United States, about  east of Downtown Los Angeles
The population was 51,268 according to the 2020 census, up from 47,796 at the 2010 census. The city's slogan, "One Mile Square and All There", was coined when the incorporated area of the city was only .

Covina is bordered by West Covina, to its south and west side. Irwindale lies to the west, as well as the unincorporated area of Vincent, and the city of Baldwin Park. Azusa and Glendora are to the north, the unincorporated community of Charter Oak to the northeast, San Dimas to the east, the unincorporated area of Ramona and city of Pomona to the southeast.

History 

Present-day Covina was originally within the homelands of the indigenous Tongva people for 5,000 to 8,000 years. In the 18th century it the became part of Rancho La Puente in Alta California, a 1770s Spanish colonial and 1842 Mexican land grant.

The city of Covina was founded in 1882 by Joseph Swift Phillips, on a  tract that was purchased from the holdings of John Edward Hollenbeck, one of the 1842 grantees of Rancho La Puente. In 1875 Hollenbeck had purchased a failed coffee plantation from three Costa Rican brothers, Pedro Maria Badilla, Julian Badilla, and Pedro Antonio Badilla; the latter purchased it from the heirs of Hollenbeck's 1842 co-grantee John A. Rowland. Four streets of Covina were named after these people, as well as Rancho La Puente, which include Badillo Street, Puente Street, Rowland Street, and Hollenbeck Avenue.

The City of Covina was named by a young engineer, Frederick Eaton, who was hired by Phillips to survey the area. Impressed by the way that the valleys of the adjacent San Gabriel Mountains formed a natural cove around the vineyards that had been planted by the region's earlier pioneers, Eaton merged the words "cove" and "vine", and in 1885, created the name Covina for the new township.

The city was incorporated in 1901, the townsite bounded by Puente Street on the south, 1st Avenue on the east, the alley north of College Street on the north, and 4th Avenue on the west. The city's slogan, "One Mile Square and All There", was coined by Mrs F. E. Wolfarth, the winner of a 1922 slogan contest sponsored by the chamber of commerce.

It was not vineyards but orange and grapefruit groves that blanketed the city. By 1909, the city was the third-largest orange producer in the world, and it still claimed to have "the best oranges in the world" as late as the 1950s. Since World War II, however, the orange groves have been largely replaced by single-family (houses) and multiple-family (apartments) dwellings.

The Covina Valley Historical Society maintains an archive illustrating the city's history in the 1911-built Firehouse Jail Museum, Covina's first municipal building, located immediately behind City Hall in Covina's Old Town.

Opened in 1997, the Covina AMC 30 located at Arrow Highway and Azusa Avenue is one of the busiest theatres in the United States. The movie theater was built on the site of a former Sears building and claims to have the largest movie multiplex in Los Angeles County.

It has been a sister city of Xalapa, Mexico, since 1964. A replica of a giant stone Olmec head, located in a place of honor in Parque Xalapa, was given to the city in 1989 by the state of Veracruz. According to the placard placed below the head, it was originally excavated from San Lorenzo de Tenochtitlan. The statue was later moved from its location in front of the police department to Jalapa Park in the southeast portion of the city.

2008 marked both the opening and the charter season of the Covina Center for the Performing Arts, a newly remodeled multimillion-dollar theatrical venue in downtown Covina.

2008 massacre

On December 24, 2008, a shooting and arson occurred. Bruce Jeffrey Pardo, dressed in a Santa Claus costume, entered a Christmas party at his ex-wife's residence and opened fire. After the shootings, Pardo unwrapped a Christmas package containing a homemade flamethrower and used it to set the home ablaze. When he left, nine family members were dead and the house was engulfed in flames. He was later found dead from a self-inflicted gunshot wound. The slayings left 15 children without one or both parents.

Geography
Covina is located at  (34.091609, -117.879193).

The only freeway that passes through the area is a very small stretch of Interstate 10. Covina is centered in the midst of Interstate 210 (Foothill Freeway) to the north, Interstate 605 (San Gabriel River Freeway) to the west, State Route 57 (Orange Freeway) to the east, and Interstate 10 to the south.

The Southern Pacific Railroad, which reached Covina in 1884, and the Metrolink San Bernardino Line pass through the city just north of the downtown area. The town is located at the foot of the San Gabriel Mountains in the San Gabriel Valley.
According to the United States Census Bureau, the city has a total area of —99.78% of it is land and 0.22% of it is water.

Climate
This region experiences hot, dry summers and mild, occasionally rainy winters. According to the Köppen climate classification system, Covina has a hot-summer Mediterranean climate, abbreviated "Csa" on climate maps.

Demographics

2010
The 2010 United States Census reported that Covina had a population of 47,796. The racial makeup of Covina was 27,937 (58.5%) White (29.9% Non-Hispanic White), 2,013 (4.2%) African American, 532 (1.1%) Native American, 5,684 (11.9%) Asian, 104 (0.2%) Pacific Islander, 9,230 (19.3%) from other races, and 2,296 (4.8%) from two or more races. Hispanic or Latino of any race were 25,030 persons (52.4%).

The Census reported that 47,361 people (99.1% of the population) lived in households, 68 (0.1%) lived in non-institutionalized group quarters, and 367 (0.8%) were institutionalized.

There were 15,855 households, out of which 6,396 (40.3%) had children under the age of 18 living in them, 7,931 (50.0%) were opposite-sex married couples living together, 2,815 (17.8%) had a female householder with no husband present, 1,072 (6.8%) had a male householder with no wife present. There were 978 (6.2%) unmarried opposite-sex partnerships, and 94 (0.6%) same-sex married couples or partnerships. 3,153 households (19.9%) were made up of individuals, and 1,179 (7.4%) had someone living alone who was 65 years of age or older. The average household size was 2.99. There were 11,818 families (74.5% of all households); the average family size was 3.43.

The population was spread out, with 11,896 people (24.9%) under the age of 18, 5,043 people (10.6%) aged 18 to 24, 13,113 people (27.4%) aged 25 to 44, 12,174 people (25.5%) aged 45 to 64, and 5,570 people (11.7%) who were 65 years of age or older. The median age was 35.7 years. For every 100 females, there were 93.3 males. For every 100 females age 18 and over, there were 89.5 males.

The homeowner vacancy rate was 1.1%; the rental vacancy rate was 6.4%. 28,707 people (60.1% of the population) lived in owner-occupied housing units and 18,654 people (39.0%) lived in rental housing units.

According to the 2010 United States Census, Covina had a median household income of $66,726, with 11.3% of the population living below the federal poverty line.

An additional 31,072 residents live in zip codes associated with Covina but outside the city limits, making the total Covina-area population 78,868 at the time of the 2010 census.

2000
As of the census of 2000, there were 46,837 people, 15,971 households, and 11,754 families residing in the city. The population density was 6,723.7 inhabitants per square mile (2,594.5/km2). The racial makeup of the city was 62.10% White, 5.03% Black or African American, 0.90% Native American, 9.82% Asian, 0.21% Pacific Islander, 17.18% from other races, and 4.78% from two or more races. 40.29% of the population were Hispanic or Latino of any race.

There were 15,971 households, out of which 38.4% had children under the age of 18 living with them, 51.6% were married couples living together, 16.3% had a female householder with no husband present, and 26.4% were non-families. 20.8% of all households were made up of individuals, and 7.7% had someone living alone who was 65 years of age or older. The average household size was 2.89 and the average family size was 3.36.

In the city, the population was spread out, with 28.1% under the age of 18, 9.5% from 18 to 24, 31.1% from 25 to 44, 20.4% from 45 to 64, and 10.9% who were 65 years of age or older. The median age was 34 years. For every 100 females, there were 92.0 males. For every 100 females age 18 and over, there were 87.0 males.

The median income for a household in the city was $48,474, and the median income for a family was $55,111. Males had a median income of $40,687 versus $32,329 for females. The per capita income for the city was $20,231. About 8.9% of families and 11.6% of the population were below the poverty line, including 15.4% of those under age 18 and 6.9% of those age 65 or over.

An additional 30,000 residents live in unincorporated areas of the three zip codes associated with Covina but outside the city limits, making the total Covina-area population 76,417.

Mexican and German were the most common ancestries. Mexico and the Philippines were the most common foreign places of birth.

Latino population
Hispanics made up 13% of Covina's residents in 1980, 26% in 1990, 40% in 2000, and 52% in 2010. The most latest and official census numbers showed Covina is 58.8% Latino

Economy

Top employers
According to the city's 2009 Comprehensive Annual Financial Report, the top employers in the city are:

Government and infrastructure
Local government in Covina is run by an elected city council through their hired city manager. Covina residents are represented at-large, currently by the following elected officials: Mayor Patricia Cortez, Mayor Pro Tem Walter Allen III, Councilmember John King, Councilmember Hector Delgado, and Councilmember Victor Linares.

Covinians who access county health services may use the Pomona Health Center in Pomona or the Monrovia Health Center in Monrovia, both operated by the Los Angeles County Department of Health Services.

Education
Covina is served by three unified school districts. The Covina-Valley Unified School District, which serves most of the city, the Charter Oak Unified School District, which serves the eastern portion and the Azusa Unified School District, which serves a small portion in the northwest.

Covina-Valley USD schools located in Covina include:

Barranca Elementary School
Ben Lomond Elementary School
Cypress Valley Elementary School
Manzanita Elementary School
Merwin Elementary School
Las Palmas Middle School
Sierra Vista Middle School
Covina High School
Northview High School

Charter Oak USD schools located in Covina include:

Badillo Elementary School
Cedargrove Elementary School
Glen Oak Elementary School
Royal Oak Middle School
Charter Oak High School

Azusa USD schools located in Covina include:

Gladstone High School
Ellington K-8 School

In popular culture
Covina is the fictional setting for the Harold Teen comic strip and 1934 movie that depicted several teenagers from Covina High School. A downtown Covina malt shop was named the Sugar Bowl (with the permission of the artist Carl Eds), imitating the after-school gathering place in the comic strip.

Scenes from several movies and television shows have been filmed in Covina, including:
 The television series Roswell was filmed in various location in Covina including the downtown area on North Citrus Avenue. City Hall, Charter Oak High School and several other businesses and residences served as locations for the fictional version of the town of Roswell, New Mexico.
 Multiple episodes of the hit television series Knight Rider were filmed in Downtown "Old" Covina, including an episode coincidentally shot at Knight's Photo Studio on Citrus, where David Hasselhoff greeted fans and passed out signed photographs.
 One of the ending shots of the movie Frailty was filmed on Center St. off of Hollenbeck.
 During the opening diner scene in Reservoir Dogs, a poster featured in the background shot is of a carnival located on Covina Blvd. and Bonnie Cove Ave.
 The "Bohemian Rhapsody" scene from the film Wayne's World was filmed on Citrus Avenue in downtown Covina, although some external shots were filmed in other locations.
 The "Grey Poupon" scene from Wayne's World was shot on Citrus Avenue. Covina Hobby was visible in the background. Having two cars side-by-side reflects (incorrectly) that the main drag had four lanes.
 The "cruising" portion of Hometown USA was filmed on Citrus Avenue.
 The interior of Covina Public Library served as the Baltimore County Public Library for the 2004 television movie Back When We Were Grownups.
An episode of Tabatha's Salon Takeover was filmed in Downtown "Old" Covina at Tantrum on Citrus Avenue.
 The theater in downtown Covina (refurbished in 2008), the library and neighborhood streets around downtown were used in the filming of High School U.S.A.—a 1983 movie starring Michael J. Fox and Nancy McKeon.
The small independent film Small Time, starring Christopher Meloni and Bridget Moynahan, was filmed at Clippinger Chevrolet, which used to be at San Bernardino Road and Citrus Avenue in Downtown Covina.
A satirical short film called Make America Great? by filmmaker Candice Vernon was filmed at Holy Trinity Episcopal Church located at Badillo and Third Avenue.

Notable people

Lacey Baker – professional skateboarder, attended Northview High School
Rick Baker – seven-time Academy Award-winning makeup artist; films include American Werewolf In London, Ed Wood, Men In Black and The Wolfman
Pamela Baird, child actress, My Friend Flicka, Leave It to Beaver, graduated from Covina High School, class of 1963
Irma Blanco – L.A. radio personality, resided in Covina
Tom Brunansky – Major League Baseball player and coach, played from 1985 to 2000 for New York Mets, Minnesota Twins, Boston Red Sox and Chicago Cubs; 1985 All-Star, member of 1987 World Series champion Twins; born in Covina
Clyde Christensen – offensive coordinator of NFL's Miami Dolphins; born in Covina, attended Royal Oak High School
Jack Clark – Major League Baseball player for San Francisco Giants, St. Louis Cardinals, New York Yankees, San Diego Padres and Boston Red Sox from 1975 to 1992; hit .267 with 340 home runs, played in 1985 World Series, four-time MLB All-Star; graduated from Gladstone High School in 1973
Art Clokey – creator of Gumby; with wife Ruth invented Gumby in early 1950s at their Covina home after Art finished film school at USC
Casey Dailey – football player for Northwestern and NFL's New York Jets
Herschel Daugherty – former film, television and theatre director.
William "Billie" Raymond DeVrell (1937–1981) – Wonderland Gang member killed in 1981 Wonderland murders is buried at Forest Lawn Memorial-Parks and Mortuaries (Covina Hills)
Donald W. Evans Jr., Sp4., (1943–1967) – Army medic awarded Medal of Honor for bravery in Vietnam War, plus Purple Heart; born in Covina
Donna Fargo – country singer, taught English at Northview High School in the 1960s and 1970s
Hussein Mohamed Farrah – son of Mohamed Farrah Aidid and former President of Somalia, graduated from Covina High School
Jason David Frank (1973–2022) – played Tommy Oliver in the Power Rangers franchise
Rod Gilfry – opera baritone
Roy Harris – composer, grew up on strawberry farm in Covina and attended Covina High School
Lillian Kinkella Keil – decorated World War II flight nurse; born in Covina
Ward Kimball – one of original Disney animators, leader of Dixieland band Firehouse Five Plus Two; Covina High School class of 1929
Robert Knapp – actor, lived in Covina in his teenage years and worked in orange groves
Bob Lorenz – anchor and studio host, New York Yankees TV network (YES Network); previously with CNN, CNNSI and Turner Sports
Mike Lynn – former NBA player for Los Angeles Lakers
Jeremy Miller – actor in TV comedy series Growing Pains; born and raised in Covina
John Molina Jr. – boxer, born in Covina
Corey Nakatani – jockey, winner of nearly 4,000 races; born and raised in Covina
Vince Neil and Tommy Lee of Mötley Crüe – met while attending Royal Oak High School
Aaron Perez – Soccer player
PattiSue Plumer – Athlete in 1980 and 1988 Olympics
Polly Plumer – American track and field runner
Alice Huyler Ramsey – died in Covina; first woman to drive across America from coast to coast. On June 9, 1909, the 22-year-old housewife and mother from Hackensack, New Jersey, completed  from Manhattan, New York, to San Francisco, California, in a Maxwell automobile; she was accompanied on the 59-day trek by three female companions, none of whom could drive a car.
 Mitrice Richardson – dancer
Jeron Roberts (born 1976) - American-Israeli basketball player
Gary Roenicke – Major League Baseball outfielder for Montreal Expos (1976), Baltimore Orioles (1978–85), New York Yankees (1986) and Atlanta Braves (1987–88), hit .247 with 121 home runs; born in Covina
Ron Roenicke – Major League Baseball player and manager, coach of 2002 World Series champion Anaheim Angels; born in Covina
Bobby Rose – Major League Baseball and Nippon Professional Baseball player; born in Covina
Rio Ruiz – baseball third baseman
Willie Shoemaker (1931–2003) – Hall of Fame jockey with 8,833 wins including four Kentucky Derbys; attended Covina High School
Jean Stafford – Pulitzer Prize-winning novelist and short-story writer
Tatiana Suarez – mixed martial artist
Rob Wilfong – Major League Baseball player for Minnesota Twins, California Angels and San Francisco Giants from 1977 to 1987, batted .248 with 39 home runs; graduated from Northview HS in 1971
Chris Woodward – Major League Baseball player (1999–2010) for Toronto Blue Jays, New York Mets, Atlanta Braves, Boston Red Sox, and Seattle Mariners; born in Covina and attended Northview HS
Ellen Beach Yaw (known as Lark Ellen) – a coloratura soprano active during the 19th and 20th centuries, who toured the world singing opera for over 40 years and chose to retire in Covina; a street in city is named for her
Michael Young – Major League Baseball infielder, 7-time All-Star selection with Texas Rangers (2004–2009, 2011), 2005 American League batting champion, 2006 MLB All-Star Game MVP, 2008 Gold Glove Award winner; born in Covina

Sister city
Covina has one sister city:
 Xalapa, Mexico

See also

 List of cities and towns in California
 List of cities in Los Angeles County, California

References

External links

Covina Chamber of Commerce

 
Cities in Los Angeles County, California
Communities in the San Gabriel Valley
Incorporated cities and towns in California
1882 establishments in California
Populated places established in 1882
Chicano and Mexican neighborhoods in California